Jinhaihu Area is an area and a town located on eastern Pinggu District, Beijing, China. Surrounding by mountains to three sides, It borders Douziyu Township to its north, Xiaying Town to its east, Nandulehe Town to its south, and Huangsongyu Township. In the year 2020, it had a population of 25,376. Its name literally translates to "Golden Sea Lake".

History

Administrative divisions 
By the end of 2021, Jinhaihu Area was composed of 28 subdivisions, in which 2 were communities and 26 were villages. They are organized in the following list:

See also 

 List of township-level divisions of Beijing

References 

Pinggu District
Towns in Beijing
Areas of Beijing